The Congressional NextGen 9-1-1 Caucus, a United States Congress caucus, works to improve the 9-1-1 phone system and emergency response systems. The caucus was headed by Senators Richard Burr (R-NC) and Amy Klobuchar (D-MN) and Representatives Dan Bishop (R-NC) and Anna Eshoo (D-CA) in 2022

History 
The caucus was formed on February 25, 2003, by Senator Conrad Burns (R-MT), Senator Hillary Clinton (D-NY), Congressman John Shimkus (R-IL) and Congresswoman Eshoo. The original name of the caucus was the "Congressional E9-1-1 Caucus". It was formed to "educate lawmakers, constituents and communities about the importance of citizen-activated emergency response systems".

On February 16, 2011, the caucus was registered as an official organization for the 112th Congress. The name was changed to the NextGen 9-1-1 Caucus.

Members 
The E9-1-1 Institute lists the following caucus members for the 117th Congress:

House members

Senate members 
 Marsha Blackburn (R-TN)
 Cory Booker (D-NJ)
 Richard Durbin (D-IL)
 Dianne Feinstein (D-CA)
 Mazie Hirono (D-HI)
 John Hoeven (R-ND)
 Amy Klobuchar (D-MN), Co-Chair
 Patty Murray (D-WA)
 Gary Peters (D-MI)
 Brian Schatz (D-HI)
 Chuck Schumer (D-NY)
 Debbie Stabenow (D-MI)
 Chris Van Hollen (D-MD)

Activity 
In 2012, Co-Chairs Shimkus and Eshoo announced that a caucus-supported bill, the Next Generation 9-1-1 Advancement Act (HR 2629), was included in the payroll tax holiday legislation that was passed by Congress. The bill, as passed in the larger tax bill, provided matching grants to organizations to support 9-1-1- call centers being able to receive voice, text, image, and video data.

In February 2014, the Federal Communications Commission (FCC) supported a proposal that would create standards requiring wireless providers to give information about a caller's location to public safety personnel. The caucus, through Co-Chair Shimkus, supported the proposal.

NG9-1-1- Institute 
The NG9-1-1 Institute is a non-profit organization located at 317 Massachusetts Avenue, Washington, D.C., whose mission it is to provide support (administrative and policy-related) to the caucus. Every year, the institute gives awards to people and groups for contributions to improving 9-1-1 services.

References 

Caucuses of the United States Congress